is a Japanese female TV star, tarento, comedian, and cosmetic surgeon. She is unusual in Japan in that she is willing to appear on television, as professional doctors are generally hesitant to appear.

Early years 
Ayako was born in Sagamihara, Kanagawa on 5 April 1971. Her father is also a doctor and runs his own hospital in her hometown.

She attended Toin Gakuen High School (学校法人桐蔭学園) and later graduated from St. Marianna University School of Medicine.

In 1996, while in medical school, she was selected as "Miss Nippon", Japan's most prestigious beauty contest.

Upon graduation from medical school, Ayako began working TV presenter known for her medical background. She has also appeared in several "Batsu games" of the variety show Gaki No Tsukai, where her appearance usually contradicts her normal professional appearance.

TV programs 
 Sunday Japon

External links 
 Ayako's profile
 

1971 births
Living people
People from Sagamihara
Japanese surgeons